Andriy Yevhenovych Bohdanov (born 21 January 1990) is a Ukrainian professional football midfielder who plays for Kolos Kovalivka.

Personal life
During the 2022 Russian invasion of Ukraine Bohdanov joined the Territorial Defense Forces of his hometown Kyiv.

Honours
Arka Gdynia
 Polish SuperCup: 2018

References

External links
 
 

1990 births
Living people
Footballers from Kyiv
Ukrainian footballers
FC Arsenal Kyiv players
FC Oleksandriya players
FC Dynamo Kyiv players
FC Dynamo-3 Kyiv players
FC Metalist Kharkiv players
Ergotelis F.C. players
FC Saxan players
Ukrainian Premier League players
Ukrainian First League players
Ukrainian Second League players
Ukraine youth international footballers
Ukraine under-21 international footballers
Ukraine international footballers
Ukrainian expatriate footballers
Expatriate footballers in Greece
Expatriate footballers in Moldova
Ukrainian expatriate sportspeople in Greece
Ukrainian expatriate sportspeople in Moldova
FC Volyn Lutsk players
FC Olimpik Donetsk players
Association football midfielders
Arka Gdynia players
Expatriate footballers in Poland
Ukrainian expatriate sportspeople in Poland
FC Desna Chernihiv players
FC Kolos Kovalivka players
Ukrainian military personnel of the 2022 Russian invasion of Ukraine